A tintinnabulum is a bell in a Roman Catholic Basilica.

Tintinnabulum may also refer to: 

 Tintinnabulum (Ancient Rome), a wind chime
 Tintinnabuli, a music compositional style devised by the Estonian composer Arvo Pärt
 "Tintinnabulum", a song on the album Adiemus: Songs of Sanctuary by Karl Jenkins 
 Dendropsophus tintinnabulum, a species of frog

See also
 Tinnitus